The Riggs-Miller Baronetcy, of Ballicasey in the County of Clare, was a title in the Baronetage of Ireland.

This title was created on 24 August 1778 for John Riggs-Miller, subsequently Member of Parliament for Newport. He is best remembered for championing a reform of the customary system of weights and measures in favor of a scientifically founded system. Born John Miller, he assumed the additional surname of Riggs in 1765, which was the maiden name of his wife, Anna, daughter and heiress of Edward Riggs. The title became extinct on the death of their son, the second Baronet, in 1825.

Riggs-Miller baronets, of Ballicasey (1778)
Sir John Riggs-Miller, 1st Baronet (died 1798)
Sir John Edward Augustus Riggs-Miller, 2nd Baronet (1770–1825)

References

Extinct baronetcies in the Baronetage of Ireland